Byram Hills High School (BHHS) is a four-year co-educational public secondary school located in Armonk, New York, United States. It is the only secondary school in the Byram Hills Central School District, and serves students from the towns of North Castle, Bedford, Mount Pleasant, and New Castle. The school has over 700 students in grades 9–12.

Athletics
The mascot of Byram Hills is the Bobcat and its colors are scarlet and navy.

Honors
In the 2022 "Best High Schools" edition by U.S. News & World Report, Byram Hills was ranked number 20 in the state and 186 nationally.

Notable alumni

 Laura Branigan – singer
 Eddie Cahill – actor
 Peter Gallagher – actor
 David Harbour – actor
 Bryce Dallas Howard – actress
 Chance Kelly – actor
 Tom Kitt – musician and composer

References

External links
 Official website

1965 establishments in New York (state)
Educational institutions established in 1965
Public high schools in Westchester County, New York